Gymnocalycium anisitsii is a globular cactus belonging to the family Cactaceae. The specific epithet honors the Hungarian pharmacist Dániel Anisits J. (1856-1911).

Description
Gymnocalycium anisitsii can be solitary or slowly clustering. It reaches a diameter of 8–15 cm and a height of about 10 cm. Sometimes a central spine is present, but it is usually absent. The spines are yellowish to brownish, slender, twisted and 1–6 cm long. The flowers are white to pink, funnel-shaped, up to 4 inches long. The red fruits are long and cylindrical, up to 2.5 cm long with a diameter of 1 cm.

Distribution
Gymnocalycium anisitsii is widespread in southern Brazil, Paraguay and Bolivia.

Habitat
This species prefers open areas with the protection of low bushes.

Subspecies
Gymnocalycium anisitsii subsp. anisitsii
Gymnocalycium anisitsii subsp. multiproliferum (P.J.Braun) P.J.Braun & Esteves

References
 Biolib
 Cactus-art
 Desert-tropicals

Bibliography
Urs Eggli, Leonard E. Newton: Etymological Dictionary of Succulent Plant Names. Birkhäuser 2004
 N. L. Britton, J. N. Rose: The Cactaceae. Descriptions and Illustrations of Plants of the Cactus Family. Band III, The Carnegie Institution of Washington, Washington 1922

anisitsii
Cacti of South America
Endemic flora of Argentina
Least concern biota of South America